Yonval is a commune in the Somme department in Hauts-de-France in northern France.

Geography
The commune was created in 1985 when it was separated from the commune of Cambron.

Population

See also
Communes of the Somme department

References

Communes of Somme (department)